The 1988 Little League World Series took place between August 23 and August 27 in Williamsport, Pennsylvania. The Taiping Little League of Taichung, Taiwan, defeated the Pearl City Little League of Pearl City, Hawaii, in the championship game of the 42nd Little League World Series.

Teams

Championship Bracket

Position Bracket

External links

Little League World Series
Little League World Series
Little League World Series
Little League World Series